Zabihabad (also Romanized as Z̄abīḩābād) is a village in Shirang Rural District, Kamalan District, Aliabad County, Golestan Province, Iran. At the 2006 census, its population was 163, in 39 families.

References 

Populated places in Aliabad County